The 2014 Louisiana–Monroe Warhawks football team represented the University of Louisiana at Monroe in the 2014 NCAA Division I FBS football season.  The team was led by fifth-year head coach Todd Berry.  The Warhawks played their home games at Malone Stadium and competed in the Sun Belt Conference. They finished the season 4–8, 3–5 in Sun Belt play to finish in a tie for seventh place.

Schedule

Source: Schedule

Game summaries

Wake Forest

In their first game of the season, the Warhawks won, 17–10 over the Wake Forest Demon Deacons.

Idaho

In their second game of the season, the Warhawks won, 38–31 over the Idaho Vandals.

@ LSU 

In their third game of the season, the Warhawks lost, 31–0 to the LSU Tigers.

Troy

In their fourth game of the season, the Warhawks won, 22–20 over the Troy Trojans.

@ Arkansas State

In their fifth game of the season, the Warhawks lost, 28–14 to the Arkansas State Red Wolves.

@ Kentucky

In their sixth game of the season, the Warhawks lost, 48–14 to the Kentucky Wildcats.

Texas State

In their seventh game of the season, the Warhawks lost, 22–18 to the Texas State Bobcats.

@ Texas A&M

In their eighth game of the season, the Warhawks lost, 21–16 to the Texas A&M Aggies.

@ Appalachian State

In their ninth game of the season, the Warhawks lost, 31–29 to the Appalachian State Mountaineers.

Louisiana–Lafayette

In their tenth game of the season, the Warhawks lost, 34–27 to the Louisiana–Lafayette Ragin' Cajuns.

@ New Mexico State

In their eleventh game of the season, the Warhawks won, 30–17 over the New Mexico State Aggies.

@ Georgia Southern

In their twelfth game of the season, the Warhawks lost, 22–16 to the Georgia Southern Eagles.

References

Louisiana-Monroe
Louisiana–Monroe Warhawks football seasons
Louisiana-Monroe Warhawks football